Veliki Korinj is a village in the hills south of Krka in the Municipality of Ivančna Gorica in central Slovenia. The municipality is part of the historical Lower Carniola region and is now included in the Central Slovenia Statistical Region. 

Archaeological evidence from a site in the village shows Eneolithic settlement in the area.

References

External links

Veliki Korinj on Geopedia

Populated places in the Municipality of Ivančna Gorica